Stevenson Adonis (born 22 September 1977), best known as Adonis Stevenson, is a Haitian Canadian former professional boxer who competed from 2006 to 2018. He won the WBC, Ring magazine and lineal light-heavyweight titles in 2013 by defeating Chad Dawson by first-round knockout, which earned him awards for Fighter of the Year and Knockout of the Year by The Ring.

Known for his fast hand speed and exceptional knockout power, Stevenson was considered one of boxing's hardest punchers during his prime. For more than five years, he made ten successful defenses of the WBC and lineal titles until sustaining a life-threatening brain injury in his 2018 fight against Oleksandr Gvozdyk.

Early life and amateur career
Stevenson's known name is an inversion of his family name and given name. Born in Port-au-Prince, Haiti, Stevenson moved to Montreal, Quebec with his family when he was seven. By 14 years old, he was living on the streets and soon fell into a violent gang which drew him into a criminal lifestyle.  In his early twenties, after a criminal trial in 1998 in Quebec, Stevenson served 18 months of a four-year prison sentence for managing prostitutes, assault, and issuing threats. While in prison, he also pleaded guilty to aggravated assault after putting a fellow inmate into a coma.  After leaving prison in 2001, Stevenson vowed he would never return.

Stevenson became Quebec Middleweight champion in 2004, and was named best amateur fighter in Canada in 2005 and again in 2006. Stevenson won the Canadian national title in 2005 and 2006. Stevenson competed in the XVIII Commonwealth Games in Melbourne, Australia in 2006, and won the silver medal, losing to local Australian Jarrod Fletcher in the final. It was also the only medal won by a Canadian boxer at the Commonwealth Games.

Professional career

Super-middleweight

Early career
A 29-year-old Stevenson turned professional in September 2006. His opponent was Mike Funk, another boxer making his debut, at the Montreal Casino in Montreal, Quebec, Canada. Stevenson knocked Funk out with a hook in twenty-two seconds.

On August 1, 2009, at Windsor Station in Montreal, Quebec, Canada, Stevenson defeated Anthony Bonsante by first round knockout. The two fighters came out of their corners for the fight with Bonsante launching the first attack, but just moments after the assault, Stevenson landed a left hand that sent Bonsante down to the canvas. Bonsante sprawled out on the canvas with his eyes closed, while the referee reached the count of six before stopping the fight. Bonsante had begun to get up at the count of six, but it was too late, leaving Bonsante livid with the decision as he chased the referee around the ring in an attempt to protest the decision, but to little avail. He also won a fifth-round TKO decision against Jermain Mackey on September 25, 2009.

Stevenson vs. Boone
On April 17, 2010, in his first fight in the United States, which also was his first time fighting for promoter Lou DiBella, he suffered his first defeat being stopped in the second round by Darnell Boone. Boone had been knocked down on the canvas twice in the first round, however, in the second round, Stevenson rushed to Boone without maintaining his defense and he got caught by a solid right sending him on the canvas for the first time in his career. Stevenson managed to get back on his feet inside the count of 10, however, the referee waved the fight off as he deemed Stevenson unable to continue.

Return to title contention
Nonetheless, Stevenson resumed with GYM Promotions and won the North American title NABA on April 8, 2011, at the expense of Derek Edwards by KO in the third round. He then won by referee stoppage in the first round against Dion Savage (Shujaa El-Amin) on September 17, 2011, and retained his title against Aaron Pryor Jr on December 10, 2011, by referee stoppage in the ninth round. Stevenson jumped from 15th to 2nd position for the IBF title, winning by KO in the first round duel against Jesús González on February 18, 2012. He then fought Noe Gonzalez on April 20, 2012, and won the fight at 1:40 in the second round when the referee stopped the fight.

His next fight originally set to be against Don George with the winner getting a shot at the IBF champion. The fight was originally scheduled to be a co-main event of a fight card also including a match between Jean Pascal and Tavoris Cloud on August 11, 2012, but the even was cancelled due to an injury suffered by Pascal. The Stevenson fight was then moved up to August 17, 2012, and was set to be part of ESPN Friday Night Fights, but Stevenson later injured his hand cancelling the fight. The fight was then rescheduled to October 12. In the fight Stevenson knocked George down twice in the fifth and once in the sixth round before winning the fight with a 12th-round TKO after knocking him down twice more.

Light-heavyweight

Stevenson vs. Boone II
On February 4, 2013, it was announced that Stevenson would get the chance to avenge his only loss as a professional against Darnell Boone (19-20-3, 8KOs) with the fight taking place on March 22 at the Bell Centre. With this fight, Stevenson was risking his IBF mandatory status. Stevenson avenged his only loss, knocking out Darnell Boone with a pair of lefts in the sixth round on March 22, 2013, at the Bell Centre. Stevenson, fighting at 171.9 pounds, forced Boone to take a knee with a right hook to the body early in the sixth, then stunned him coming out of a corner with a left uppercut, followed with a straight left that sent Boone on the canvas.

Stevenson vs. Dawson
Stevenson moved up to light heavyweight to challenge Lineal/WBC/The Ring champion Chad Dawson (31-2, 17 KOs) on June 8, 2013, at the Bell Centre. In the press conferences leading up to the fight, Dawson called the fight a tune-up, also claiming that he had to Google Stevenson because he had never heard of him. Stevenson hit Dawson with a left hook that dropped him very early in the first round of the fight, and though Dawson got up before the count of eight the referee stopped the fight, giving Stevenson an unexpected knockout victory. Stevenson's victory was his eighth straight since his only career defeat, all coming by knockout. At 174 1/4 lbs., Stevenson was fighting at the heaviest weight of his professional career to date. In the post-fight, Stevenson told HBO's Max Kellerman, "I caught him, and that's a beautiful punch." Dawson admitted, "It was a punch I didn't see. He caught me. That's it. He caught me with a good punch." Dawson suffered his second consecutive stoppage loss. In the 76 seconds the fight lasted, Dawson landed 2 of 16 punches thrown and Stevenson landed 3 of his 15 thrown. Stevenson stated the reason he moved up was due to not being able to secure a world title fight at super middleweight, accusing Carl Froch and Mikkel Kessler of ducking him and fighting each other instead in a rematch. The knockout was voted as Ring Magazine Knockout of the Year for 2013.

Stevenson vs. Cloud, Bellew
The WBC originally ordered Stevenson to face mandatory challenger Tony Bellew, but then allowed him to make a voluntary defense first against Tavoris Cloud, where the winner of the fight must face Bellew at a later date.

The fight against former IBF champion Tavoris Cloud (24-1, 19 KOs) was confirmed on August 12, 2013, to take place on September 28 at the Bell Centre in Montreal, Quebec on HBO. Cloud was entering the fight coming off his first career loss, which came in March 2013 against Bernard Hopkins. Stevenson dominated the precedings, flustering Cloud with quick hands and shocking power. The fight ended when Cloud failed to answer the bell for the start of the eighth round. Round 7 saw Cloud hurt many times and a cut appearing on his right eye. He was also cut on the left eyelid in the opening round.

Terms were agreed for the fight on July 25, 2013. On November 30, Stevenson defended his light heavyweight title against Tony Bellew (20-1-1, 12 KOs) at the Colisée Pepsi. Stevenson became the first boxer to stop Bellew winning the fight via TKO. In round 6, Stevenson put Bellew down with a left hand, he beat the count and the referee let the fight go on. Bellew was then knocked out standing by another pair of left hands before the referee could get in and put a stop to the bout. At the time of stoppage, Stevenson was ahead on the scorecards 50–45, 49–46, and 50–45. Bellew contemplated moving up to cruiserweight after the loss. According to Nielsen Media Research firm, the fight attracted an average of 1.3 million viewers on the HBO network, making it the 5th most watched bout of 2013.

Stevenson vs. Fonfara, Sukhotsky
In January 2014, 26 year old Andrzej Fonfara (25-2, 15 KOs) notified the IBF, who had ordered him to fight Dmitry Sukhotsky in a final eliminator, that he would pass on the opportunity because he had agreed a deal to fight lineal/WBC/The Ring champion Stevenson. IBF would instead order Sukhotsky to fight their #3 ranked Cedric Agnew. In February, Stevenson signed a deal with boxing adviser Al Haymon.The fight was scheduled for May 24 on HBO, until HBO cancelled the date from their boxing schedule. On March 25, Michel confirmed the fight would take place on Showtime instead. Stevenson started off very well, dropping his opponent twice with sharp lefts and appeared close to stopping his opponent. Fonfara however, recovered very well, even dropping Stevenson in the ninth round. Stevenson similarly recovered quickly. The two fighters exchanged punches in a good-action final round and the crowd gave the fight a standing ovation. Stevenson won the fight as the judges scored it 116–109, 115–110, and 115–110. CompuBox Stats showed over the 12 rounds, Stevenson landed 329 of 790 punches thrown (42%) and Fonfara landed 217 of his 613  thrown (35%). In the post-fight interview, Stevenson claimed he hurt his left hand in the second round. He added that he was willing to fight Bernard Hopkins or Sergey Kovalev next, but would leave the decision to his manager, Al Haymon. Kovalev's promoter stated that this fight may never happen. That the window has now closed, alleging that Stevenson's age is a contributing factor. The fight, which marked Stevenson's Showtime debut, averaged 672,000 viewers and peaked at 800,000 viewers.

In October 2014, promoter Yvon Michel of GYM announced that Stevenson would next defend his belts against Russian contender Dmitry Sukhotsky (22-2, 16 KOs) in Quebec City, Quebec at the Colisée Pepsi on December 19, 2014, on Showtime. Sukhotsky was on a four-fight win streak at the time. Michel explained Sukhotsky was selected as Stevenson's opponent because there would not have been enough time to get together and promote a fight with Jean Pascal (29-2-1, 17 KOs). He stated the Pascal fight would likely take place in the Spring of 2015. This was his fourth defense of his titles. Stevenson retained his belts via a fifth round stoppage following a one punch knockout. Stevenson was in control from the opening bell, throwing minimal punches as the crowd started to boo. In round 2, he managed to floor Sukhotsky with a left hand. According to CompuBox Stats, Stevenson landed 80 of 272 punches thrown (29%) and Sukhotsky landed only 23 oh his 136 thrown (17%).

Stevenson vs. Bika, Karpency
On February 28, 2015 Premier Boxing Champions announced that Stevenson would defend his titles against 35 year old former WBC super middleweight champion Sakio Bika (32-6-3, 21 KOs) on April 4 at the Pepsi Coliseum in Quebec City. It was the first fight to headline PBC on CBS. Stevenson dropped Bika in rounds 6 and 9 en route to winning the fight on the scorecards after 12 rounds, retaining his world titles. The judges scored the fight 115–111, 116–110, and 115–110. ESPN's Dan Rafael scored the fight 120–106 for Stevenson, who dominated the fight using his left hand. Bika failed to make an adjustment and get in much offence of his own. In round 5, Stevenson landed a left which dropped Bika, but referee Michael Griffin ruled it a slip. Bika however appeared hurt. In the post-fight interview, Stevenson said, "I knew he is a tough guy, so I prepared for 12 rounds and I put on a good show. He's never been knocked out, but I dropped him." Stevenson admitted he felt Bika's power and was able to withstand anything that came his way.

On July 27, 2015 Premier Boxing Champions announced that Stevenson would headline a card on Spike TV on September 11 against WBC #9 ranked Tommy Karpency (25-4-1, 14 KOs) at the Ricoh Coliseum in Toronto. Karpency, previously coming off the biggest win of his career, a split decision win against Chad Dawson, the man who Stevenson beat to win the light heavyweight championship. Karpency was thought to be a stepping stone for Adonis, and he was. After barely escaping round 2, Karpency got knocked down at the beginning of round 3. He immediately knocked Karpency down after he got up, and the referee called a halt to the bout, awarding Stevenson a TKO victory in round 3. The fight averaged 581,000 viewers.

In November 2015, citing the fact that Stevenson hadn't faced a top-ranked opponent in the last two years, The Ring Magazine stripped Stevenson of his belt.

Stevenson vs. Williams Jr.
On May 31, 2016, it was announced that Stevenson would defend his WBC and Lineal titles against 28 year old southpaw Thomas Williams Jr. (20-1, 14 KOs) on July 16 in Quebec headlining a Premier Boxing Champions card. This was Stevenson's seventh defense of his WBC and Lineal light heavyweight titles. Williams weighed in the heaviest of the two at 174.6 pounds, with Stevenson weighing in at 173.6 pounds. In a brief slug fest,  Stevenson knocked out Williams in round 4 to retain his titles in his seventh successful defense. Stevenson connected with a hard left to Williams' head in round one that floored him with approximately 30 seconds left, however Williams beat the referees count.

Stevenson vs. Fonfara II
Undefeated Colombian boxer Eleider Álvarez (22-0, 11 KOs) became mandatory challenger following his win over Isaac Chilemba in November 2015. He then knocked out former super-middleweight world champion Lucian Bute in February 2017 in a final eliminator to become mandatory challenger once again for the WBC light heavyweight title. On February 27, 2017, the WBC ordered negotiations to begin between Stevenson and Álvarez, who are both managed by Al Haymon and promoted by Yvon Michel of GYM for a deal to be reached within 30 days or they would force a purse bid on March 24. Stevenson had a return date scheduled for April 29 at the newly renovated Nassau Coliseum in New York. Promoter Yvon Michel, stated on behalf of Álvarez, that he had averted from his mandatory position to allow Stevenson a voluntary defence.

On April 8, Stevenson revealed on social media that he had finalized a deal to fight Andrzej Fonfara (29-4, 17 KOs) in a rematch from their first fight in 2014. Yvon Michel later told ESPN that the fight would take place in Canada, at the Centre Bell in Montreal Quebec on June 3, 2017. The last time Stevenson fought at that arena was in 2014 against Fonfara. Fonfara was ranked #6 by the WBC at the time. Michel didn't go into detail around why a fight with Sean Monaghan, who he was tipped to fight originally in New York, never materialized, but said, if he continues winning, the fight could still happen. Fonfara started the fight well in round 1, connecting with the jab. Stevenson, who was patient with his left hand, eventually landed a left hook to the head of Fonfara, dropping him to the canvas. Fonfara beat the count, but was on steady legs and when he got backed up to in the corner, the bell saved him from an onslaught. Round 2 opened with Stevenson carrying on where he left of, pummeling Fonfara with huge lefts. The fight came to an abrupt end, when Fonfara's trainer, Virgil Hunter stepped up on the apron after just 28 seconds, motioning to the referee to stop the bout, which referee Michael Griffin did. Stevenson retained his WBC and Lineal world titles. When asked who Stevenson would fight next, he replied, "I'm the greatest at 175. I don't have to call out anybody," On the same card, Eleider Álvarez defeated Jean Pascal via majority decision to remain mandatory to Stevenson.

Stevenson vs. Jack
After Badou Jack (21-1-3, 13 KOs) defeated Nathan Cleverly in August 2017, to win the WBA 'Regular' light heavyweight title, he began to call out Stevenson, knowing that Stevenson had a mandatory challenger. Stevenson shrugged it off, claiming he was ready for anyone, "It was a good performance. He beat Cleverly now. So now he called me out and I'm ready. I'm ready to fight and I'm ready to unify the title. For Andre Ward or him, I'm ready. It doesn't matter to me [which one]. It's great for me to unify and add another title to my collection. I want to unify the titles. This is my goal and that's what I want to do." On September 8, 2017, mutual promoter Yvon Michel disclosed that there was serious ongoing negotiations between Stevenson and mandatory challenger Eleider Álvarez (23-0, 11 KOs) to fight before the end on 2017. He revealed the fight would take place in Quebec. In September, Michel said that he had a difficult time finalizing a date and venue for the fight, which meant the fight could get pushed to the end of January 2018. He also responded to claims of Jack wanting to fight Stevenson, saying it would only be possible if it were a unification. Michel confirmed the fight would take place on Showtime in January 2018. Michel spoke to Showtime about not going head to head locally with David Lemieux's next fight, which would take place on December 16 on HBO. On November 8, there was rumours stating that Stevenson would once again pay Álvarez a step-aside fee, in order to fight Badou Jack. Álvarez spoke to TVA Sports saying, "I do not think I'm going to fight Stevenson. I do expect to receive that (step-aside offer), and then I will analyze it with my team." On December 1, it was reported that GYM had offered Álvarez a step-aside deal which would give him 'a multi-fight agreement with six-figure guarantee per fight', with Stevenson being part of deal as well. On December 6, the WBC announced that they would investigate into Stevenson's title reign and lack of mandatories. A week later, the WBC stated they would allow Stevenson to avoid Álvarez once again in order to fight Jack. The WBC went on to state they would order Álvarez to fight Ukrainian boxer Oleksandr Gvozdyk (14-0, 12 KOs) for the interim title. Álvarez withdrew from the fight before the purse bid was scheduled on January 12, 2018. On January 24, 2018, Showtime confirmed the fight would take place on May 19 in Canada. The Bell Centre in Montreal was confirmed as the venue.

On April 11, news broke out from Álvarez's manager, Stephane Lepine that a deal was yet to be reached with Álvarez to be properly compensated. Yvon Michel admitted he was working on a deal to keep Álvarez happy and this was the same reason as to why tickets had not yet gone on sale for the Stevenson-Jack fight, which was a month away. On April 18, it was announced that a deal had been reached for Álvarez to challenge Sergey Kovalev (32-2-1, 28 KOs) for his WBO light heavyweight title on HBO. Kovalev was originally scheduled to fight contender Marcus Browne in the summer of 2018, however due to having been arrested for domestic violence, Kovalev's promoter, Kathy Duva of Main Events got in contact with Álvarez's manager Lepine about a potential fight. Due to Álvarez fighting Kovalev, this meant the announcement of Stevenson vs. Jack would be imminent.  On April 23, the card was moved from Montreal and instead scheduled to take place at the Air Canada Centre in Toronto, Ontario, Canada. A day later, the official press conference was held to announce the fight.

Stevenson and Jack fought to a majority draw in a competitive bout. One judge scored the fight 115–113 in favor of Jack, whilst the remaining two judges overruled the decision, scoring the fight 114–114. Stevenson outpointed Jack in the early rounds being more active, however from round 5, it was Jack who was the busier and accurate of the two. From rounds 7 through 10, Jack out landed Stevenson 114–40 in total shots landed. It was in round 10 were Jack was hurt from multiple body shots from Stevenson's right hand. Stevenson carried the momentum into round 11 but it was Jack who finished the fight stronger. In round 7, Stevenson complained to referee Ian John Lewis about low blows and in round 8, Jack was warned. Jack later explained Stevenson's cup was low, hence why the shots looked like low blows. With the draw, Stevenson retained his WBC and Lineal titles for the ninth time. Jack was ranked as #1 at light heavyweight by the WBC at the time.

During the post fight interviews, Stevenson told Steve Gray, "I won the fight because I hurt him in the body. I hurt him in the body and he got slowed down. I kept the pressure on him. He was moving and moving – slick, slick – but I touched him more of the time and I think I won this fight." Speaking on the 3rd draw in his last 4 fights (before Bute was DQ'd for failed drug test), Jack stated, "I have no idea. It could be they're jealous of Floyd (Mayweather). I'm one of Floyd's top fighters. Maybe they don't like Floyd. Maybe they're trying to – you know, I don't know. To be honest, I don't know. I've gotta thank God for everything. ... I can't do anything about it. I thought I definitely won the fight, definitely won the fight. Nobody's complaining and no judge had him winning." According to CompuBox Stats, Stevenson landed 165 of 622 punches thrown (27%), 87 of which were power shots landed to the body and Jack landed 209 of his 549 thrown (38%) The fight averaged 535,000 viewers and peaked at 611,000 viewers on Showtime. The fight aired on pay-per-view in Canada.

Stevenson vs. Gvozdyk 
On June 18, 2018, the WBC ordered Stevenson to make a mandatory defence against interim champion Oleksandr Gvozdyk (15-0, 12 KOs). In case a deal could not be reached, purse bids were set for July 2, 2018, where the split of 65-35 would be in favour of Stevenson. Yvon Michel of GYM won the rights to promote the fight with the winning bid of $2.1 million. He stated the fight was being targeted for November 3, 2018, in Quebec. Top Rank made a bid of $1.65 million. There was controversy surrounding the purse bids and claims of collusion by Top Rank. Initially, the bid was won by Phil Weiss on behalf of Tom Brown's TGB Promotions, with the winning bid at $3.102 million. TGB Promotions was known at the time for having close ties with Al Haymon, who was also the advisor of Stevenson. According to reports, the winning bid was withdrawn just minutes later. The next highest bidder, Michel, automatically won the bid, winning the rights to the fight. The WBC stated they would look into the claims. On July 6, the WBC upheld the purse bid giving Michel the promotional rights, however also stated they would impose punishment on TGB promotions of some sort. WBC president tweeted the bout would take place on December 1, 2018. Showtime confirmed they would televise the bout, which took place at Videotron Centre in Quebec, before the Deontay Wilder-Tyson Fury PPV telecast at the Staples Center in Los Angeles, California.

Gvozdyk ended Stevenson's five-year reign as champion by stopping him in round 11 by TKO to claim the WBC and Lineal titles.
Earlier in the fight, Gvozdyk knocked Stevenson down with a counter right hand to the head. Referee Michael Alexander did not rule it a knockdown, however replays later showed it was. Gvozdyk was the busier boxer landing punches through the mid rounds and it was Stevenson who looked to be landing the better shots in some rounds, but not all of them. Gvozdyk was spending most rounds using his movement to box on the outside. In round nine, Stevenson started throwing body shots, and had success landing them. At the same time, Stevenson seemed to be fading. In round 10, Gvozdyk was hurt after getting hit with a left hand that sent him into the ropes. Despite the ropes holding Gvozdyk up, the referee again did not call a knockdown. In round 11, Gvozdyk unloaded a 10-punch flurry that sent Stevenson down. The referee stopped the bout with Stevenson still on the canvas, as there was no signs of him beating the count.  The time of stoppage was 2  minutes and 49 seconds of the round. At the time of stoppage, Stevenson was ahead 98–92 and 96–94 on two of the judges scorecards and the third judge had it 95–95. Gvozdyk celebrated with his team and trainer Teddy Atlas, but composed themselves quickly as soon as they realized Stevenson was badly hurt. Stevenson was able to sit back on his stool whilst doctors checked on him. In the post-fight interviews, Gvozdyk said, "This win means everything to me. I've trained my whole life for this, and tonight, all of the hard work was worth it." He also praised his new trainer Atlas. Stevenson began to feel dizzy in his dressing room, and was taken to a local hospital. Atlas ruled the 98-92 scorecard from Canadian judge Jack Woodburn as 'criminal'. However, Atlas did not criticize referee Griffin for missing the knockdowns.

The morning after the fight, it was reported that Stevenson was in critical condition in intensive care. The following Monday, his condition was changed to stable from critical and was placed in an induced coma. On December 20, despite a Russian tabloid reporting Stevenson had woken up and was seen speaking to family and friends, his promoter Yvon Michel stated he was still unconscious and his health had not improved since being sedated by doctors. He also required 'mechanical assistance' to breathe. On December 22, according to his girlfriend Simone God, Stevenson had woken up. As of February 18, 2019, Stevenson moved to a medical facility in Montreal, Canada, to continue receiving treatment related to his recovery. According to ESPN Deportes, Stevenson is talking and moving, becoming more mobile every day, and is well on the road to recovery. As of January 6, 2021, Stevenson is almost back to full health and in good spirits.

Personal life
In 2012, in response to questioning at a press conference before a fight, Stevenson admitted to previously serving jail time in Bordeaux, Quebec, on charges of managing prostitutes, assault, and making threats. Stevenson served four years in prison for these crimes, and offenses which took place while incarcerated. Stevenson was released in 2001.

Professional boxing record

See also
List of light heavyweight boxing champions
List of WBC world champions

References

External links

Adonis Stevenson at Cyber Boxing Zone

Adonis Stevenson - Profile, News Archive & Current Rankings at Box.Live

Living people
1977 births
Sportspeople from Port-au-Prince
Boxers from Montreal
Middleweight boxers
Boxers at the 2006 Commonwealth Games
Commonwealth Games silver medallists for Canada
Black Canadian boxers
Haitian emigrants to Canada
Canadian male boxers
Haitian Quebecers
Super-middleweight boxers
World Boxing Council champions
The Ring (magazine) champions
Commonwealth Games medallists in boxing
World light-heavyweight boxing champions
Southpaw boxers
People with traumatic brain injuries
People with disorders of consciousness
People convicted of assault
Sportspeople convicted of crimes
Medallists at the 2006 Commonwealth Games